(also written (26375) 1999 DE9) is a trans-Neptunian object. Light-curve-amplitude analysis shows only small deviations, suggesting  is a spheroid with small albedo spots. Measurements by the Spitzer Space Telescope estimate that it is 461 ± 45 km in diameter. It was discovered in 1999 by Chad Trujillo and Jane X. Luu. It is possibly a dwarf planet.

 orbit is in 2:5 resonance with Neptune's. Spectral analysis has shown traces of ice.

References

External links 
 

Trans-Neptunian objects in a 2:5 resonance
1999 DE9
1999 DE9
Possible dwarf planets
19990220